Joe Okonkwo is an American writer, whose debut novel Jazz Moon won the Edmund White Award and was shortlisted for the Lambda Literary Award for Gay Fiction, in 2017.

Okonkwo's short stories have appeared in The Piltdown Review, The New Engagement, Storychord, Penumbra, Promethean, and Shotgun Honey. His work has been anthologized in Love Stories from Africa, Best Gay Love Stories 2009, Best Gay Stories 2015 and Strength. His short story "Cleo" was nominated for a Pushcart Prize. He served as Prose Editor for Newtown Literary, a journal dedicated to publishing and nurturing writers from Queens, New York. He edited Best Gay Stories 2017. Okonkwo has led creative writing classes at Gotham Writers' Workshop, Newtown Literary/Queens Library, and the Bronx Arts Council. He served on the planning committee for the Provincetown Book Festival.

Joe Okonkwo's work is highlighted by complicated characters, male and female, who find themselves at the intersection of Black and gay identities, illustrating the challenges they face, and the price they pay, to live authentic lives.

He earned a BA in theater from the University of Houston and an MFA in creative writing from City College of New York.

Originally from Syracuse, New York, he has been based in New York City since 2000.

Okonkwo's story collection, Kiss the Scars on the Back of my Neck, was published by Amble Press on October 10, 2021.

References

External links

21st-century American novelists
American male novelists
African-American novelists
American LGBT novelists
LGBT African Americans
American gay writers
Writers from Syracuse, New York
Writers from New York City
Living people
American people of Nigerian descent
21st-century American male writers
Novelists from New York (state)
Year of birth missing (living people)
21st-century African-American writers
African-American male writers